The 2012 Alabama State Hornets football team represented Alabama State University as a member of the East Division of the Southwestern Athletic Conference (SWAC) during 2012 NCAA Division I FCS football season. Led by sixth-year head coach Reggie Barlow, the Hornets compiled an overall record of 7–4 with a mark of 7–2 in conference play. Alabama State played home games in Montgomery, Alabama, at the Cramton Bowl until Thanksgiving Day, when they moved into the newly-built Hornet Stadium.

Schedule

Media
All Hornets football games were broadcast live on WVAS 90.7 FM and were streamed on the team's website at bamastatesports.com.

References

Alabama State
Alabama State Hornets football seasons
Alabama State Hornets football